WMSW (1120 AM, "Radio Once") is a radio station licensed to serve Hatillo, Puerto Rico.  The station is owned by Aurora Broadcasting Corporation. It airs a News/Talk format.

The station was assigned the WMSW call letters by the Federal Communications Commission on December 31, 1979.

References

External links
WMSW official website

News and talk radio stations in Puerto Rico
Radio stations established in 1980
Hatillo, Puerto Rico
1980 establishments in Puerto Rico